Zongyang County, is a county in southern Anhui province, located mostly on the northern (left) bank of the Yangtze River. It is under the jurisdiction of the prefecture-level city of Tongling. The government of Zongyang County is located in Zongyang Town. On 13 October 2015, Zongyang County jurisdiction was transferred from Anqing to Tongling.

In the past, Zongyang County was named Tonglu County. In 1951, Tonglu County was changed to Hudong County. In 1954, the county seat was moved to Zongyang Town. On July 1, 1955, the name of the county in Han Dynasty was restored-Zongyang County. In January 2016, Zongyang County was officially placed under the jurisdiction of Tongling City by Anqing City.

Administrative divisions
Zongyang County has jurisdiction over seventeen towns, five townships and one other area.
Seventeen towns:
Zongyang, Oushan, Tanggou, Laozhou, Chenyaohu, Zhoutan, Hengbu, Xiangpu, Qianqiao, Qilin, Yijin, Fushan, Huigong, Guanbuqiao, Qianpu, Jinshe, Bailiu

Five townships:
Tietong Township, Fengyi Township, Changsha Township, Baimei Township, Yutan Township

Other area:
Zongyang Economic Development Area

Historical divisions of Guangshui:

Towns:
Zongyang, Oushan, Tanggou, Laozhou, Chenyaohu, Zhoutan, Hengbu, Xiangpu, Qianqiao, Qilin, Changsha Township, Qianpu Township, Jinshe Township, Baimei Township, Baihu Township, Huigong Township, Yutan Township

Dialect
Zongyang dialect is a dialect of Lower Yangtze Mandarin which is spoken in Zongyang County.

Climate

References

County-level divisions of Anhui
Tongling